Jeff Ratcliffe (born March 15, 1976 in Coquitlam, British Columbia) is a former lacrosse player for the New York Titans and the Philadelphia Wings in the National Lacrosse League. Ratcliffe attended the University of Maryland, Baltimore County.

Ratcliffe was a first round draft pick in the 2001 NLL Entry Draft by the Philadelphia Wings, and played for seven seasons with the Wings, being named to the All-Star team in 2004. After the 2007 season, Ratcliffe was released by the Wings, and signed by the New York Titans for the 2008 NLL season. Ratcliffe played one season in New York before retiring to spend more time with his family.

Statistics

NLL

References

1976 births
Living people
Canadian lacrosse players
National Lacrosse League All-Stars
New York Titans (lacrosse) players
People from Coquitlam
Philadelphia Wings players
Sportspeople from British Columbia
UMBC Retrievers men's lacrosse players